Vlachopoulo is the central village of the municipality of Papaflessas in the center of Messenia, Greece.
The village is located 38 km from the capital of the prefecture Kalamata and just 20 km from the nearest beach. 
Vlachopoulo is a rural village, the main products are olives, raisins and grapes. The village is famous for the festival of which every year become the Holy Spirit. Many people from across Messinia ascend on the first morning to Panagitsa chapel atop Magklavas mountain where the view is spectacular and the evening continues with bouzouki at the village.

External links
  http://www.vlahopoulo.gr/

Populated places in Messenia